The , signed as Route 7, is one of the tolled routes of the Shuto Expressway system serving the Greater Tokyo Area. It connects Tokyo's Mukojima Route in central Tokyo to the Keiyō Road which connects Tokyo to Chiba Prefecture and its capital, the city of Chiba.

Route description

The Komatsugawa Route begins at Ryōgoku Junction with the Mukojima Route in Sumida ward above the Sumida River. From there it travels east through Sumida and Kōtō parallel to National Route 14 and the Sōbu Line before crossing over the Arakawa River in Edogawa. At this crossing the Komatsugawa Route passes beneath the Central Circular Route. The expressway has two junctions with local roads east of the crossing in Edogawa. After those junctions the expressway leaves the Shuto Expressway network, from there it continues east towards Chiba as the Keiyō Road.

The speed limit on the Komatsugawa Route is set at 60 km/h.

History
The entirety of the Komatsugawa Route was opened to traffic on 21 March 1971. The expressway was extensively rehabilitated in November 1991 under the project name "Route 7 Refresh Plan". On 16 February 2015, the expressway was temporarily closed in Edogawa due to a fire that broke out during construction work on the route. The incident claimed the lives of two workers.

In preparation for increased congestion during the 2020 Summer Olympics, new traffic-control systems were installed along many expressways in the Tokyo area. The only instance of further controls being installed along the expressway was at its western terminus at Ryōgoku Junction

An additional interchange between the Central Circular Route and the Komatsugawa Route was opened on 1 December 2019. Part of the project to add the junction included upgrades to the already extant interchange at Komatsugawa.

Junction list

See also

References

External links

7
1971 establishments in Japan
Roads in Tokyo